Paraepepeotes guttatus is a species of beetle in the family Cerambycidae. It was described by Félix Édouard Guérin-Méneville in 1844, originally under the genus Monohammus. It is known from India and China.

References

External Links
  Myers, P., R. Espinosa, C. S. Parr, T. Jones, G. S. Hammond, and T. A. Dewey. 2022. The Animal Diversity Web (online). Accessed at https://animaldiversity.org/accounts/Paraepepeotes_guttatus/classification/.

Lamiini
Beetles described in 1844